Room 203 is an 2022 American horror film directed by Ben Jagger, starring Francesca Xuereb and Viktoria Vinyarska, which centers on two best friends who, who have recently moved in together as roommates, and realize that their new apartment is haunted by murderous spirits. Written by John Poliquin, Nick Richey and Ben Jagger, the film is based on the Japanese novel of the same name written by Nanami Kamon and published by Kobunsha.

Jointly produced by American firm AMMO Entertainment and affiliated Japanese company Ammo Inc., the film was released in the United States by Vertical Entertainment on April 15, 2022, with worldwide sales handled by Voltage Pictures.

Premise
When lifelong best friends Kim and Izzy move into a newly rented Gothic-style apartment, excited to begin a new and independent life away from home, and forget about a tragic incident that had interrupted their friendship. But a series of strange and frightening occurrences convinces Kim that the apartment is haunted. With the aid of her new boyfriend Ian, Kim investigates and discovers a terrible curse linked with Morrigu, goddess of vengeance, that may doom Izzy to a fate worse than death.

Cast
 Francesca Xuereb as Kim White, the film's protagonist.
 Viktoria Vinyarska as Izzy Davis, Kim's best friend.
 Eric Wiegand as Ian, Kim's boyfriend.
 Scott Gremillion as Ronan, Kim and Izzy's landlord.
 Rick LaCour as Milton Briggs, a former janitor.
 Quinn Nehr as Tony, Izzy's date at a local bar.
 Sam Coleman as Steve, Tony's friend.
 Timothy McKinney as Dr. Phillips, Kim's college professor.
 Patrick and Susan Kirton as Samuel and Ann White, Kim's parents.
 Terry J. Nelson as Bob, a building contractor.
 Jeroen Frank Kales as Chad, Bob's construction assistant.
 Cameron Inman as Lena, Chad's girlfriend.
 Yuji Ayabe as a delivery man.
 Bria Fleming as Sandy, a television casting director's assistant.

Production
Development and production of Room 203 took place in 2020, with the film shooting in Shreveport, Louisiana during fall 2020 under COVID-19 safety protocols. The film was financed by Akatsuki Entertainment, an affiliate and predecessor company of AMMO Entertainment and Ammo Inc. Production of the film took 19 days, and filming of the main apartment location took place at The Standard Downtown Lofts, a National Register of Historic Places listed building in Shreveport. Prior to the start of production, members of the film crew discovered human remains in the building, and actress Francesca Xuereb subsequently described experiencing paranormal phenomena during the production. AMMO Entertainment and Ammo Inc. subsequently completed the post-production in early 2021. In June 2021, Voltage Pictures acquired worldwide sales rights for the film, citing the robust market for J-horror-derived projects among international buyers; Voltage subsequently represented the film to buyers at the July 2021 Cannes Film Market.

Release
In October 2021, Vertical Entertainment acquired distribution rights for a limited theatrical, home-video, and video on demand release for the United States. The film was released theatrically and on-demand on April 15, 2022, with the home-video release following on June 21, 2022. In July 2022, Room 203 launched on Hulu, where it debuted in sixth place on Hulu's viewership rankings for the week.

Internationally, Room 203 received theatrical releases in select territories. In Russia, the film opened in the top 10 at the box office, earning $83,048 in its opening weekend. In Lithuania, the film opened in third place with an opening weekend gross of $14,563, and remained in the top 10 for the following month. In Poland, the film opened in fifth place, earning $53,954 in its first week. The film also received theatrical releases in the United Arab Emirates, Saudi Arabia, Egypt, Jordan, Latvia, Malaysia, and Bangladesh. In total, the film grossed $361,497 in worldwide theatrical revenue.

Reception
On Rotten Tomatoes, the film has an approval rating of 60% based on reviews from 10 critics, with an average rating of 4.90/10.

Writing for Film Threat, Alan Ng praised Room 203 as doing "an excellent job of paying homage to Asian horror" and called the film "just right for avid fans of indie horror flicks." Steve Hutchinson of Tales of Terror highlighted the lead performances of Xuereb and Vinyarska, while describing the film as "a drama sprinkled with horror... a sad and melancholic story, and when it’s scary, it’s terrifying." Nathaniel Muir of AIPT Comics noted "the most prevalent theme is one of friendship... there is a genuineness not often seen in haunted house movies" and said Xuereb and Vinyarska's acting "carries the film." Writing for Assignment X, Abbie Bernstein heralded the "excellent lead performances by Francesca Xuereb and Viktoria Vinyarska," noting "Xuereb has warmth and sincerity, and Vinyarska navigates Izzy’s various moods with skill." Keri O'Shea of Warped Perspective identified Room 203 as being "more interested in relationship-building than generic scares" and summarized the film as "a well-made, often thoughtful, muted take on the [horror] genre." In a negative review, Owen Gleiberman of Variety critiqued the film as spending too much time focusing on the real world and lacking sufficient scares.

References

External links
 
 
 

2020s English-language films
2022 films
2022 horror films
American haunted house films
American horror thriller films
American mystery horror films
American psychological horror films
American psychological thriller films
American supernatural horror films
Films about curses
Films about friendship
Films based on horror novels
Films based on Japanese novels
Films shot in Louisiana
Supernatural drama films
Vertical Entertainment films
2020s American films